Professor Adam Hardy is an architect and architectural historian, and Professor of Asian Architecture at the Welsh School of Architecture, Cardiff University. He is Director of PRASADA, a centre bringing together research and practice in South Asian art and architecture.

His research is largely in the history of architecture in South Asia, particularly Hindu temple architecture, as well as that of Indian Buddhist and  Jain temples. Going against a prevailing tendency to focus narrowly, his work has embraced most of the subcontinent, and a very long time span, while at the same time involving detailed formal analysis. He has tried to bring to light a meaningful way of looking at what at first sight seem bewilderingly complex structures. The work has revealed striking structural homologies between architecture and other branches of culture, and shown how, within a number of regional traditions, forms evolve in a characteristic way, notwithstanding conspicuous artistic inventiveness. Drawings have played an important role in his research, not only for explanation but also as a means of analysis.

He was educated at the Royal Grammar School, High Wycombe (1965–71) and Trinity College, Cambridge.

Roles
 Editor of South Asian Studies 
 Director, PRASADA 
 Principal Investigator, The Indian Temple: Production, Place, Patronage (AHRC project)
 Editorial Board member for Context, Abacus, Pakistan Heritage
 Advisory Editor to OUP Online Bibliographies, Hinduism module
 Council member, British Association for South Asian Studies 
 Executive Committee member, European Association of South Asian Art and Archaeology 
 Member of AHRC Peer Review Academy

Books
 Theory and Practice of Temple Architecture in Medieval India: Bhoja's Samaranganasutradhara and The Bhojpur Line Drawings (New Delhi: Dev Publishers & Distributors and Indira Gandhi National Centre for the Arts, 2015)
 The Temple Architecture of India (Chichester: Wiley, 2007) 
 The Temple in South Asia (ed.)(London: British Academy, 2007)
 Architectural History and the Studio, edited with Necdet Teymur (London: Question Press, 1997)
 Indian Temple Architecture: Form and Transformation: the Karṇāṭa Drāviḍa Tradition, 7th to 13th Centuries, 1995, Abhinav Publications, New Delhi, 9788170173120, google books

References

Living people
British architectural historians
British Indologists
Academics of Cardiff University
People educated at the Royal Grammar School, High Wycombe
1953 births
Historians of Indian art